"Here Comes the Rain Again" is a 1983 song by British duo Eurythmics and the opening track from their third studio album Touch. It was written by group members Annie Lennox and David A. Stewart and produced by Stewart. The song was released on 12 January 1984 as the album's third single in the UK and in the United States as the first single. 

It became Eurythmics' second Top 10 U.S. hit, peaking at number 4 on the Billboard Hot 100. "Here Comes the Rain Again" hit number eight in the UK Singles Chart, becoming their fifth consecutive Top 10 single in their home country.

Song information
Stewart explained to Songfacts that creating a melancholy mood in his songs is something at which he excels. He said: "'Here Comes the Rain Again' is kind of a perfect one where it has a mixture of things, because I'm playing a b-minor, but then I change it to put a b-natural (sic – the song is in A minor) in, and so it kind of feels like that minor is suspended, or major. So it's kind of a weird course. And of course that starts the whole song, and the whole song was about that undecided thing, like here comes depression, or here comes that downward spiral. But then it goes, 'so talk to me like lovers do.' It's the wandering in and out of melancholy, a dark beauty that sort of is like the rose that's when it's darkest unfolding and bloodred just before the garden, dies. And capturing that in kind of oblique statements and sentiments."

Stewart also said he and Lennox wrote the song while staying at the Mayflower Hotel in New York City. It was an overcast day, and Stewart was playing "melancholy A minor-ish chords with the B note in it" on his Casio keyboard. Lennox came over, looked out the window at the gray skies and the New York skyline, and spontaneously sang, "Here comes the rain again". The duo worked out the rest of the song based on that mood.

The string arrangements by Michael Kamen were performed by members of the British Philharmonic Orchestra. However, due to the limited space in the studio, the Church, the players had to improvise by recording their parts in other parts of the studio. The song was then mixed by blending the orchestral tracks on top of the original synthesized backing track.

The running time for "Here Comes the Rain Again" is in actuality about five minutes long and was edited on the Touch album (fading out at approximately four-and-a-half minutes). Although it was edited even further for its single and video release, many U.S. radio stations played the full-length version of it. The entire five-minute version did not appear on any Eurythmics album until the U.S. edition of Greatest Hits in 1991.

Cash Box said that "Lennox sounds familiarly sultry and wispy, while Dave Stewart’s minor-key composition is laced with pizzicato strings and chiming, open chord guitar work."

In the UK, the single became Eurythmics' fifth Top 10 hit, peaking at #8. It was the duo's second top ten hit in the United States, peaking at #4 in March 1984.

Music video
The music video, featuring both Annie Lennox and Dave Stewart, was directed by Stewart, Jonathan Gershfield and Jon Roseman, and released in December 1983, a month before the single came out. The video opens with a passing aerial shot of the Old Man of Hoy on the Island of Hoy in the Orkney Islands before transitioning to Lennox walking along the rocky shore and cliff top. She later explores a derelict cottage while wearing a nightgown and holding a lantern. Stewart stalks her with a video camera. In many scenes the two are filmed separately, then superimposed into the same frame.

Track listings
7"
A: "Here Comes The Rain Again" (7" Edit) – 3:53
B: "Paint A Rumour" (Long Version) – 8:00

12"
A: "Here Comes The Rain Again" (Full Version)* – 5:05
B1: "This City Never Sleeps" (Live Version, San Francisco '83) – 5:30
B2: "Paint A Rumour" (Long Version)* – 8:00

* both (Versions) are longer than the ones found on the Touch album

Other versions
 "Here Comes The Rain Again" (Freemasons Vocal Mix) – 7:17 / (2009)
 "Here Comes The Rain Again" (Freemasons Radio Edit) – 4:41 / (2009)
”Here Comes The Rain Again (Disconet Extended Version) -6:57 / (1984)

Charts

Weekly charts

Year-end charts

Certifications

Personnel
Eurythmics
Annie Lennox - vocals, keyboard
Dave Stewart - guitar, keyboard

Additional personnel
Michael Kamen - conductor
British Philharmonic - strings

Sampling
The song's opening was used in the Belgium Dance act Oxy's 1992 single "The Feeling."
 George Nozuka sings the same note when he says "Talk to me" with a slight stutter on his hit single, "Talk to Me". Another hit by Nozuka, "Last Night", features a riff that is inspired by "Sweet Dreams".
The line "Talk to me" is interpolated in Alice DeeJay's song "Better Off Alone".
 The lyrics of the chorus were interpolated in the 1995 song "Tragedy" by RZA from the Wu-Tang Clan.
 The lyrics "Walk with me, like lovers do/Talk to me, like lovers do" were used in Platinum Weird's song "Taking Chances" which incidentally, was co-written by Stewart. "Taking Chances" was later covered by Celine Dion and released as the title track of her 2007 album.
 The lyrics of the chorus were sampled in Jamaican singer's Nadirah X song "Here It Comes" in 2010 on her debut album Ink.
 Madonna sampled the song on her Sticky & Sweet Tour in 2008–2009 with her own song Rain as a video interlude.

References

External links

1983 songs
1984 singles
Eurythmics songs
RCA Records singles
Songs written by Annie Lennox
Songs written by David A. Stewart
Song recordings produced by Dave Stewart (musician and producer)